Rafiq Uddin Bhuiyan Stadium, also known as Mymensingh Zilla Stadium or simply Mymensingh Stadium, is located by the side of Police Lines Road in the district of Mymensingh, Bangladesh. It is a multipurpose stadium. Cricket, football and cultural programs take place here.

List of first-class cricket
 27 November 2000: Biman Bangladesh Airlines v Dhaka Division ( Green Delta National Cricket League 2000/01 )
 9 January 2002: Dhaka Division v Sylhet Division ( Green Delta National Cricket League 2000/01 )
 23 January 2002: Dhaka Division v Chittagong Division ( Ispahani Mirzapore Tea National Cricket League 2001/02 )
 7 February 2002: Dhaka Division v Rajshahi Division ( Ispahani Mirzapore Tea National Cricket League 2001/02 )

See also
 Stadiums in Bangladesh
 Tangail Stadium
 List of football stadiums in Bangladesh
 List of cricket grounds in Bangladesh
 Sheikh Kamal International Stadium, Gopalganj

References

Cricket grounds in Bangladesh
Football venues in Bangladesh
Saif SC